Gopalapuranam is a 2008 Indian Malayalam-language comedy-drama film directed by K. K. Haridas and starring Mukesh and Ramana.

Plot 

Gopalakrishnan is the son of Gopalan Nair, who rears cows and sells milk for a living. Gopalan Nair, now in his sixties, finds it hard to continue with his job and calls for the assistance of Remanan, the president of milkmen association and the only friend of his son Gopalakrishnan. Even though Gopalakrishnan could not pursue his studies after his sixth standard, he is not ready for any hard work and is only interested in making money the easy way.

Gopalakrishnan's only sister Nandini comes across a person named Vishnu and they soon get married. Vishnu is a gold smuggler who works under Mathew. Gopalakrishnan too joins smuggling business with Vishnu and proves himself as too good in that. But because of his greed he makes a big mistake and now the different gangs are behind him and Vishnu who wants their gold and money back.

Cast

Soundtrack

References

External links 
 
 https://web.archive.org/web/20090703080112/http://popcorn.oneindia.in/title/503/gopalapuranam.html

2008 films
2000s Malayalam-language films
Films directed by K. K. Haridas